Hunde (Kihunde; also Luhunde, Kobi, Rukobi) is a Great Lakes Bantu language spoken by the Hunde people or Bahunde in Nord-Kivu province in the Democratic Republic of the Congo. It is primarily spoken in the territories of Masisi, Walikale, Nyiragongo, Rutshuru and Kalehe.

References

Ethnic groups in the Democratic Republic of the Congo
Languages of the Democratic Republic of the Congo
Great Lakes Bantu languages